Sherrod Williams (1804–1876) was an American politician and lawyer. He served as a United States House of Representatives from Kentucky; and as a Kentucky Member of Congress.

Biography 
Sherrod Williams was born in 1804 in Pulaski County, Kentucky, and he moved with his parents to Wayne County in childhood. He received a limited education, but had learned the trade of brickmaker in Monticello when about fifteen years of age. He studied law and was admitted to the bar and practiced law. 

His sons included Thomas Hansford Williams, the former Attorney General of California from 1858 to 1862; and George E. Williams (1835–1899), a former member of the California State Assembly's 15th District, from 1873 to 1875. 

He served as member of the Kentucky State House of Representatives from 1829 to 1834, and in 1846. Williams was elected as an Anti-Jacksonian Whig to the Twenty-fourth, Twenty-fifth, and Twenty-sixth Congresses (March 4, 1835 – March 3, 1841). He served as chairman of the Committee on Invalid Pensions (Twenty-sixth Congress). He was not a candidate for reelection.

He moved to California, where he died in San Jose, California. He was buried in Laurel Hill Cemetery in San Francisco, he was moved to Cypress Lawn Memorial Park.

References

External links  

1804 births
1876 deaths
People from Pulaski County, Kentucky
Censured or reprimanded members of the United States House of Representatives
Kentucky Whigs
National Republican Party members of the United States House of Representatives from Kentucky
Whig Party members of the United States House of Representatives
19th-century American politicians
Burials at Cypress Lawn Memorial Park
Burials at Laurel Hill Cemetery (San Francisco)